Technician is the student newspaper of North Carolina State University. Its first edition was published in 1920, and it has been published continuously since that date, becoming a daily paper in fall 1988. Since 2018, the newspaper has been published on Thursdays, with stories also published online throughout the week at http://www.technicianonline.com. The newspaper is funded by in-paper and online advertising and is a part of NC State Student Media. NC State's Student Media Board of Directors oversees NC State Student Media, which includes Technician, other student-led publications, and a college radio station, WKNC-FM.

Notable alumni
 Roy H. Park, media mogul, founder of broadcasting and newspaper chain Park Communications Inc.
 William C. Friday (1941), American educator and leader of the University of North Carolina system from 1956-86. 
 Chris Hondros, photographer and 2003 finalist for the Pulitzer Prize
 Richard Curtis (1972), a founder and managing editor of graphics and photography for USA Today
 Joseph Galarneau (1989), chief operating officer for Newsweek

Controversies
Like many student newspapers, Technician has seen its share of controversies, including:

 In 1990, the newspaper ran an editorial calling for the dismissal of embattled head basketball coach Jim Valvano. Valvano, a popular figure who led the team to the 1983 national championship, had come under fire for ethical and regulatory lapses in handling the basketball program. The editorial was resented as a publicity stunt. Valvano ultimately left the university under fire.
 On September 3, 1992, a conservative opinion columnist harshly criticized African-American students' demands for a black cultural center at the University of North Carolina at Chapel Hill. This column, paired with a front-page article with the headline "Black Students Vent Rage in Dining Hall"—a report on a NC State Student Government meeting to get feedback from African-American students on campus in a follow-up to recent events in Chapel Hill—resulted in widespread theft of the edition (it is distributed free). Students also burned copies of the Technician in the Brickyard in protest. The aftermath led to the creation of the university's African-American interest publication, Nubian Message.
 Following disastrous Wolfpack basketball seasons in 1995 and 1996, Technician published staff editorials asking for the resignation or firing of coach Les Robinson. The editorials were timed to run on the eve of the ACC Tournament play-in game for last-place teams, which had become known throughout the conference as "The Les Robinson Invitational." Robinson resigned following his team's loss at the tournament. Asked if he had any regrets at his farewell press conference, Robinson said, "Only that the school paper called me a loser."
 After new leadership took the helm at the paper in Spring 1997, several Technician editors and reporters were fired without just cause and escorted from the newspaper's offices by university public safety officers. Two months later, three of the fired editors used their inside knowledge of the production process to hijack the last edition of the paper for the school year, secretly inserting a full-column editorial criticizing the new editor-in-chief for using her power over personnel matters to settle personal scores and calling on university administrators to intervene. All 18,000 copies of the paper were distributed on campus the next morning containing the critical editorial, and the new student management was left unable to retract it until the resumption of publication the following semester. Technician's insulted editor-in-chief filed a report with public safety, which investigated the matter as a larceny. Despite dusting for fingerprints and questioning the former employees, investigators were unable to find any evidence against the suspected perpetrators and no charges were filed.
 On August 29, 2005, a crowd of approximately 200 Greek Life and African American Student Advisory Council representatives gathered on Harris Field to protest a Technician article entitled "Sorostitutes are weak and wounded."  Students complained the article was an unfair representation of women's activities in Greek Life. While the event received a lot of media attention, it was quickly overshadowed by Hurricane Katrina's destruction on the Gulf Coast.
 In January 2006, Technician ran an article by student contributor Jeff Gaither, stating that drunk driving was at times unavoidable and giving tips on how to avoid getting caught.  The author subsequently wrote a retraction of the article.
 In February 2014, Editor-in-Chief Sam DeGrave discontinued the traditional "Daily Tar Hell" satire newspaper while citing racist, sexist, and homophobic humor of past editions as his motivation for halting the ever-popular publication. Several students and alumni were unhappy with the decision and consequently sent a plethora of letters to the editor to voice their frustration. Many argued that the "hateful humor" was not prevalent in recent years and the satire was all in good taste while others were upset to see one of the few longstanding traditions of the university being tampered with. Very few wrote letters in support of the decision to discontinue the satire edition. DeGrave published a letter from the editor titled "One week in Daily Tar Hell", in which he condescendingly responded to his readers' criticism. Nonetheless, the "Daily Tar Hell" was later brought back into publication.

Technician Editors-in-Chief
1919-1920 • vol. 1 • Marion Francis
1920-1921 • vol. 2 • J.H. Lane
1921-1922 • vol. 3 • E.C. Tatum
1922-1923 • vol. 4 • Alvin M. Fountain
1923-1924 • vol. 4 • W.S. Morris
1924-1925 • vol. 5 • S.R. Wallis
1925-1926 • vol. 6 • E. G. Moore
1926-1927 • vol. 7 • R.R. Fountain
1927-1928 • vol. 8 • W.L. Roberts
1928-1929 • vol. 9 • A. Lawrence Aydlett
1929-1930 • vol. 10• A.L. Weaver
1930-1931 • vol. 11• Roy H. Park
1931-1932 • vol. 12 • Louis H. Wilson
1932-1933 • vol. 13 • H.A. McClung Jr.
1933-1934 • vol. 14 • E.J. Lassen
1934-1935 • vol. 15 • Eugene S. Knight
1935-1936 • vol. 16 • Robert B. Knox Jr.
1936-1937 • vol. 17 • R. Hall Morrison, Jr.
1937-1938 • vol. 18 • Dick McPhail
1938-1939 • vol. 19 • Stephen Sailer
1939-1940 • vol. 20 • E.P. Davidson
1940-1941 • vol. 21 • Henry B. Rowe
1941-1942 • vol. 22 • Carl Sickerott
1942-1943 • vol. 23 • Don Barksdale
1943-1944 • vol. 24 • Gordon West
1944-1945 • vol. 25 • Walter W. Harper
1945-1946 • vol. 26 • Bobby Wooten
1946-1947 • vol. 27 • Jack Fisler
1947-1948 • vol. 28 • Dick Fowler
1948-1949 • vol. 29 • Avery Brock
1949-1950 • vol. 30 • Joe Hancock
1950-1951 • vol. 31 • Bill Haas
1951-1952 • vol. 32 • Paul Foght
1952-1953 • vol. 33 • Bob Horn
1953-1954 • vol. 34 • George Obenshain
1954-1955 • vol. 35 • John Parker
1955-1956 • vol. 36 • L.C. Draughon
1956-1957 • vol. 37 • Terry Lathrop
1957-1958 • vol. 38 • Jim Moore
1958-1959 • vol. 39 • Ray Lathrop
1959-1960 • vol. 40 • Jim Moore
1960-1961 • vol. 41 • Jay Brame
1961-1962 • vol. 42 • Mike Lea
1962-1963 • vol. 43 • Mike Lea
1963-1964 • vol. 44 • Grant Blair & Allen Lennon
1964-1965 • vol. 45 • Cora Kemp
1965-1966 • vol. 46 • Bill Fishburne & Bob Holmes
1966-1967 • vol. 47 • Jim Kear
1967-1968 • vol. 48 • Bob Harris
1968-1969 • vol. 49 • Pete Burkhimer
1969-1970 • vol. 50 • George Panton
1970-1971 • vol. 51 • Jack Cozort
1971-1972 • vol. 52 • Richard Curtis
1972-1973 • vol. 53 • John N. Walston
1973-1974 • vol. 54 • Beverly Privette
1974-1975 • vol. 55 • Bob Estes
1975-1976 • vol. 56 • Kevin Fisher
1876-1977 • vol. 57 • Howard Barnett
1977-1978 • vol. 58 • Lynne Griffin
1978-1979 • vol. 59 • David Pendered
1979-1980 • vol. 60 • John Flesher
1980-1981 • vol. 61 • Andrea Cole
1981-1982 • vol. 62 • Tucker Johnson
1982-1983 • vol. 63 • Tom Alter
1983-1984 • vol. 64 • Jeffrey Bender
1984-1985 • vol. 65 • Jeffrey Bender
1985-1986 • vol. 66 • Barry Bowden
1986-1987 • vol. 67 • John Austin
1987-1988 • vol. 68 • Joseph Galarneau
1988-1989 • vol. 69 • Michael Hughes
1989-1990 • vol. 70 • Dwuan June, editor
1990-1991 • vol. 71 • Wade Babcock
1991-1992 • vol. 72 • William Holmes
1992-1993 • vol. 73 • Joe Johnson
1993-1994 • vol. 74 • Mark Tosczak
1994-1995 • vol. 75 • Colin B. Boatwright
1995-1996 • vol. 76 • Ron Batcho & Jean Lorscheider
1996-1997 • vol. 77 • Chris Baysden
1997-1998 • vol. 78 • Terry H. Bennett
1998-1999 • vol. 79 • Phillip Reese
1999-2000 • vol. 80 • Ebonie Polite
2000-2001 • vol. 81 • Jack Daly & Mark McLawhorn
2001-2002 • vol. 82 • Mark McLawhorn & Jimmy Ryals
2002-2003 • vol. 83 • Jerry Moore & Mathew Pelland
2003-2004 • vol. 84 • Thushan Amarasiriwardena & Carie Windham
2004-2005 • vol. 85 • Matthew Middleton
2005-2006 • vol. 86 • Rebecca Heslin
2006-2007 • vol. 87 • M. Tyler Dukes
2007-2008 • vol. 88 • Joshua Harrell
2008-2009 • vol. 89 • Saja Hindi
2009-2010 • vol. 90 • Ty Johnson, fall editor; Lauren Blakely, Kate Shefte and Russell Witham, spring co-editors
2010-2011 • vol. 91 • Amanda Wilkins
2011-2012 • vol. 92 • Laura Wilkinson 
2012-2013 • vol. 93 • Mark Herring
2013-2014 • vol. 94 • Sam DeGrave
2014-2015 • vol. 95 • Ravi K. Chittilla
2015-2016 • vol. 96 • Kaitlin Montgomery
2016-2017 • vol. 97 • Rachel Tanner Smith
2017-2018 • vol. 98 • Jonathan T. Carter
2018-2019 • vol. 99 • Jonathan T. Carter
2019-2020 • vol. 100 • Dan Gilliam
2020-2021 • vol. 101 • Rachael Davis
2021-2022 • vol. 102 • Jaylan Harrington
2022-2023 • vol. 103 • Shilpa Giri

References

1.  NCSU Libraries Special Collections Resource Center, Raleigh. North Carolina State University. 17 August 1998 https://d.lib.ncsu.edu/collections/technician

External links
 Technician Online
 Guide to the North Carolina State University Division of Student Affairs Publications, 1889-2008 

Student newspapers published in North Carolina
North Carolina State University